Henry E. Moore, of Concord, New Hampshire, was an American singing school master, who is best known for organizing the first of many conventions of singing masters in the country. The first convention began with an ordinary class at the Boston Academy of Music, but became a convention in 1840.

References

Notes

Year of birth missing
Year of death missing
American male singers
People from Concord, New Hampshire